The X Factor Arabia, originally aired on March 26, 2006 with the title XSeer Al Najah (meaning Elixir or Essence of Success) is the Arab version of The X Factor. The Arabic-language version of the program also created by Simon Cowell has a similar format to the British version, in that there are judges who each have a team of contestants to mentor and compete with each other for the X Factor title. The 14-episode first series was broadcast in 22 Arabic-speaking countries. In its debut, it was known as being one of the most watched programs on television and was produced and supported by Rotana, one of the largest production companies in the Arab World. The winner of XSeer Al Najah earned a chance to sign with Rotana. However, with the continuing success of the rival pan-Arab series Star Academy on Lebanese Broadcasting Corporation (LBC), XSeer All Najah lost most of its pan-Arab appeal and was discontinued after season 2.

In 2012, the Egyptian TV channel CBC announced that The X Factor Arabia would return in 2013 with four judges: Elissa, Carole Samaha, Wael Kfoury, and Hussain Al Jasmi. Despite its revamped format, The X Factor Arabia struggled against its rival show MBC's Arab Idol which aired at the same time slot as The X Factor.

In 2014, MBC brought the rights for the show from CBC, revamped its format and started producing season four. Only Elissa as a judge and Bassel Alzaro as a host were retained from season three during MBC's restructure of the show. The judges on MBC The X Factor are Ragheb Alama, Elissa and Donia Samir Ghanem. The first episode aired on 14 March 2015 on MBC1 and MBC Masr.

After a new hiatus of almost two-and-a-half years, the programme rights were purchased by the Dubai Channel and DMC and was relaunched at the end of 2017. The judges were Donia Samir Ghanem from season 4, the Lebanese Najwa Karam replacing Elissa, the Iraqi Majid Al Mohandis replacing Ragheb Alama and Tunisian Saber Rebai as a fourth addition judge.

Summary
 
In each series, each judge is allocated a category to mentor and chooses three acts to progress to the live finals. This table shows, for each series, which category each judge was allocated and which acts he or she put through to the live finals.

Key:
 – Winning judge/category. Winners are in bold, eliminated contestants in small font.

Season 1 (2006)

Results summary
Colour key
 Act in team Nelly

 Act in team Khaled

 Act in team Michel

Season 2 (2007)

Season 3 (2013)
Colour key

Season 4 (2015)

Season 5 (2017-18)

References

External links
 Official XSeer Al Najah website

Television series by Fremantle (company)
Arab
2006 television series debuts
2007 television series endings
2013 television series debuts
Non-British television series based on British television series
Reality television articles with incorrect naming style